"There Will Be Time" is a song by English rock band Mumford & Sons and Baaba Maal. It was released as the lead single from their extended play, Johannesburg, on 16 April 2016. The song peaked at number 100 on the UK Singles Chart.

Track listing

Charts

Release history

References

2016 singles
2016 songs
Mumford & Sons songs